Tappeh Hammam-e Olya (also Romanized as Tappeh Ḩammām-e ‘Olyā; also known as Tappeh Ḩammām-e Bālā) is a village in Murmuri Rural District, Kalat District, Abdanan County, Ilam Province, Iran. At the 2006 census, its population was 190, in 35 families. The village is populated by Lurs.

References 

Populated places in Abdanan County
Luri settlements in Ilam Province